Andrea von Kampen is an American folk singer-songwriter.

Biography
Andrea von Kampen was born in Ann Arbor, Michigan. The daughter of Dory von Kampen, an English teacher, and Dr. Kurt von Kampen, a music professor and composer. She was raised in Ann Arbor and Seward, Nebraska. She grew up singing in church and school choirs. Von Kampen attended Seward High School, a public high school in the small town of Seward, Nebraska. She initially attended Belmont University in Nashville, Tennessee. She later transferred to Concordia University Nebraska, graduating in 2016 with a degree in music.

Von Kampen first gained national popularity with her submission to the 2016 Tiny Desk Contest of Let Me Down Easy which was retweeted by NPR Music. She finished the contest as a top ten finalist. Von Kampen again gained public note with her cover of Forever Young for Hafod Hardware's 2019 Christmas advertisement video, a partnership that continued in other years. In 2021 von Kampen signed a record deal with Fantasy Records. In addition to releasing her own music, Von Kampen has collaborated with her brother, composer David von Kampen.

Discography
 Another Day (EP) - September 1, 2015
 See It Through (Single) - September 9, 2016
 AVK Christmas Project (EP) - November 24, 2016
 Desdemona (EP) - December 14, 2016
 Andrea von Kampen on Audiotree Live (EP) - June 28, 2017
 Boots of Spanish Leather (Single) - January 15, 2018
 Portland (Single) - October 5, 2018
 Julia (Single) - November 2, 2018
 Wildwood Flower (Single) - January 11, 2019
 Crossing the Bar (Single) - September 20, 2019
 Twilight & Evening Bell (Single) - October 18, 2019
 Forever Young (Single) - December 4, 2019
 Romeo & Juliet (EP) - March 13, 2020
 Will You Still Love Me Tomorrow (Single) - March 27, 2020
 Hard Times Come Again No More (From the Original Motion Picture "Molto Bella") (Single) - July 17, 2020
 Song For Mel (Single) - October 2, 2020
 Old Country - February 8, 2019
 A Midwest Christmas (Single) - November 6, 2020
 Take Back Thy Gift (Single) - May 14, 2021
 That Spell - August 6, 2021

References

1994 births
Living people
American folk singers
American women singer-songwriters
Musicians from Omaha, Nebraska
People from Ann Arbor, Michigan
People from Seward, Nebraska
Concordia University Nebraska alumni
21st-century American women
Singer-songwriters from Nebraska
Singer-songwriters from Michigan
Musicians from Ann Arbor, Michigan